Margaret Pomeroy is a former international lawn and indoor bowls competitor for Wales.

Bowls career

World Championships
In 1977 she won the gold medal in the triples with Enid Morgan and Joan Osborne, bronze medal in the fours with Morgan, Osborne and Janet Ackland and a silver medal in the team event (Taylor Trophy), at the 1977 World Outdoor Bowls Championship in Worthing.

Eleven years later she won a bronze medal at the 1988 World Outdoor Bowls Championship in Auckland.

National
Pomeroy has won 12 titles at the Welsh National Bowls Championships (1965, 1969, 1973, 1976, 1981 singles; 1969, 1975, 1982, 1985, 1988 pairs; 1979, 1985 triples) when bowling for the Howard Gardens and Sophia Gardens Bowls Clubs respectively. and seven indoor National titles, three in the pairs, three in the triples and one in the fours.

References

Date of birth missing
Welsh female bowls players
Bowls World Champions
Bowls players at the 1986 Commonwealth Games
Commonwealth Games competitors for Wales